L'Île Coco (Coco Island) is one of the largest islands by size within the St. Brandon archipelago and was permanently inhabited by fishermen until recently. It is still sometimes used as a base by a local fishing company for fly fishing and fly casting activities. 

The island is inhabited by many thousands of sea birds and seasonally by turtles coming to lay their eggs.

See also 
 St. Brandon
 Île Raphael
 L'île du Sud

References 

Islands of St. Brandon
Mascarene Islands
Outer Islands of Mauritius
Reefs of the Indian Ocean
Fishing areas of the Indian Ocean
Important Bird Areas of Mauritius
Atolls of the Indian Ocean